University of Prince Mugrin  is located in Madinah , Saudi Arabia. It was founded in 2017. The university is named after Prince Mugrin bin Abdulaziz Al Saud, who was a member of the Saudi royal family and a former intelligence chief.

The university has six colleges: the College of Business Administration, the College of Engineering, the College of Computer Science and Information Systems, the College of Architecture and Design, and the College of Applied Medical Sciences, and the College of General Studies. UPM offers undergraduate and graduate programs across several fields of study, including business, engineering, computer science, law, and humanities.

References

External links 
University of Prince Mugrin Website

2017 establishments in Saudi Arabia
Universities and colleges in Saudi Arabia
Educational institutions established in 2017